Kokila is a 1990 Indian Telugu-language film directed by Geetha Krishna, starring Naresh, Shobhana, and Sarath Babu. The film is based on eye transplantation. It is L. B. Sriram's debut as a film writer. He went on to become a successful writer and actor in later years.

Plot
Naresh, a typical young man, falls in love with Shobhana. She too eventually falls for him and both get married. At first they live happily, however later on Naresh loses his eyes in an accident, which is when trouble starts for them. An eye transplant is done and strangely Naresh sees except but a pointing gun towards him. The doctors are astonished that what Naresh experiencing is what the person whose eyes were transplanted, experienced at the moment of his death. The doctors then decide to hire Sarath Babu, a police officer to solve this case. Sarath Babu does not believe that eyes have retaining power. The rest of the movie is whether the mystery is solved.

Cast
 Naresh as Siddhartha
 Shobhana as Kokila
 Sarath Babu as CBI officer Eshwar
 Geetha
 శివకృష్ణ as Police Officer
 Nassar
 Kota Srinivasa Rao
 Brahmanandam
 Ranganath as eye specialist
 Jeeva
 Mallikarjuna Rao
 Kota Srinivasa Rao as Phanibushan Rao

Soundtrack

External links

See Also
The Eye, a 2008 movie with a similar plot

1990 films
1990s Telugu-language films
Indian romantic thriller films
Films scored by Ilaiyaraaja
Indian romantic drama films
1990s romantic thriller films
1990 romantic drama films